Shepherdswell with Coldred is a civil parish in the Dover District of Kent, England.

A section of the major A2 London to Dover road runs  through the parish at the south-west. Apart from this road, all others within the parish are minor and unnumbered. The National Rail mainline from London to Dover runs through the parish, partly by tunnel.

Parishes surrounding Shepherdswell with Coldred are Womenswold at the north-west; Eythorne at the north; Tilmanstone at the north-east; Whitfield at the south-east; Lydden at the south; and Denton with Wootton at the south-west.

There are two parish churches: St Andrew's in Shepherdswell, and St Pancras' in Coldred.

Historically Shepherdswell with Coldred contained the manors of Popeshall, Coldred and Shebbertswell.

The Grade I listed country house mansion of Waldershare Park, dating to 1705-12, is within Shepherdswell with Coldred at its eastern boundary.

References

External links
Shepherdswell with Coldred Parish Council website

Civil parishes in Kent
Dover District